Cruel Love is a 2007 South Korean television drama series starring Kwon Sang-woo, Lee Yo-won, and Kim Sung-soo. It aired on KBS2 from December 3, 2007 to February 5, 2008 on Mondays and Tuesdays at 21:55 for 20 episodes.

Despite lackluster domestic viewership ratings, it recorded high export revenues from Japan and Taiwan due to Kwon's Korean Wave appeal.

Synopsis 
Na In-jung struggles with her love between the rather cold and rebellious Yong-ki and a successful businessman, Soo-hwan. Kang Yong-ki is a pop culture artist. He was separated from his first love, Jo Ann, and still carries the wound that he suffered from their relationship. His half sister is Joo-ran who is married to Soo-hwan. Soo-hwan begins an affair with In-jung but he only has ambition for the CEO position of Yong-ki's father's company. Soon after he discovers that his ambition does not fill the emptiness that he has inside and realizes he needs In-jung. But In-jung and Yong-ki have already fallen in love with each other. Will In-jung go back to her first love or stay with Yong-ki?

Cast

Main characters
 Kwon Sang-woo as Kang Yong-ki
 Lee Yo-won as Na In-jung
 Kim Sung-soo as Lee Soo-hwan
 Cha Ye-ryun as Park Shin-young / Jo Ann
 Kim Ga-yeon as Kang Joo-ran, Soo-hwan's wife and Yong-ki's half-sister

Supporting characters
 Park Geun-hyung as Chairman Kang Woo-taek, Yong-ki's father
 Song Ok-sook as Lee Jin-sook, Joo-ran's mother
 Kim Chang-wan as Hwang In-soo
 Bang Eun-hee as Park Chan-sook
 Kim Min-jung as Soo-hwan's mother
 Choi Yong-min as In-jung's father
 Yu Ji-in as In-jung's mother
 Choi Sung-min as Yoon Sil-gang
 Jung Woo as Han Jung-woo
 Kim Hyang-gi as Lee Mi-so, Soo-hwan's daughter
 Yoon Hee-seok as Yong-ki's friend
 Lee Ha
 Lee Joo-seok

Ratings

International broadcast
Under the title Cruel Love, it aired in the Philippines beginning June 22, 2009 on the GMA Network. The Tagalog-dubbed version was re-aired three times worldwide on GMA Life TV from April 7, 2014 to June 11, 2014; November 17, 2014 to January 21, 2015 and September 21, 2015 to November 25, 2015.

It premiered in Japan on cable channel WOWOW on September 19, 2008. This was followed by re-airings on terrestrial network TBS and on cable channel KNTV from June 18 to August 21, 2012.

Remake
In 2014, was filmed a licensed remake of "Bring back my love to me." His filmed TV channels "Inter" (Ukraine) and Russia-1 (Russia). Quality rating of Kinopoisk 7.826 of 10.

References

External links
  
 
 
 

Korean-language television shows
Korean Broadcasting System television dramas
2007 South Korean television series debuts
2008 South Korean television series endings
South Korean romance television series
South Korean melodrama television series
Television series by Doremi Entertainment